Luciano Dompig (born 2 March 1987 in Amsterdam) is a Dutch professional footballer who plays primarily as a central midfielder for FC Lisse.

Club career
Dompig made his senior debut on 24 March 2006 for FC Volendam in a match against Helmond Sport. After a stint with Veendam and Almere City FC, in 2011 he transferred from the Dutch Jupiler League to the Belgian Pro League as he signed with Cercle Brugge. He later played in Cyprus and Thailand and returned to Holland to join FC Lisse in 2016 after his Thai club TOT folded.

References

External links
 Luciano Dompig player info at the official Cercle Brugge site 
 Luciano Dompig player info at almere-cityfc.nl 

1987 births
Living people
Footballers from Amsterdam
Dutch sportspeople of Surinamese descent
Association football midfielders
Dutch footballers
FC Volendam players
SC Veendam players
Almere City FC players
Cercle Brugge K.S.V. players
Aris Limassol FC players
Luciano Dompig
FC Lisse players
Eerste Divisie players
Belgian Pro League players
Cypriot Second Division players
Dutch expatriate footballers
Expatriate footballers in Belgium
Expatriate footballers in Cyprus
Expatriate footballers in Thailand
Dutch expatriate sportspeople in Belgium
Dutch expatriate sportspeople in Cyprus
Dutch expatriate sportspeople in Thailand